was a city located in Ehime Prefecture, Japan. The Toyo-town was founded on January 1, 1971. The city of Toyo formed October 1, 1972.

As of 2003, the city had an estimated population of 32,652 and the density of 441.90 persons per km². The total area was 73.89 km².

On November 1, 2004, Tōyo, along with the towns of Komatsu and Tanbara (both from Shūsō District), was merged into the expanded city of Saijō and no longer exists as an independent municipality.

Dissolved municipalities of Ehime Prefecture
Populated places established in 1971
Populated places disestablished in 2004
1971 establishments in Japan
2004 disestablishments in Japan
Saijō, Ehime